Events from 2012 in Switzerland.

Events
Public holidays in one or several cantons of Switzerland are marked (¹).

January
January 1: New Year's Day¹
January 2: Berchtoldstag¹
January 13-15-2012 International Bernese Ladies Cup is in play

February

March
March 13-Sierre coach crash, kills 28 of 52
March 19:Saint Joseph's Day
March 29:Good Friday
March 31:Easter Day
March 31-April 8-2012 World Men's Curling Championship is held in Basel

April
April 1:Easter Monday
April 8-2012 World Men's Curling Championship ends

May
May 1:May Day
May 9:Ascension Day
May 19:Pentecost
May 20:Whit Monday
May 30:Corpus Christi

June

July

August
August 1:Swiss National Day
August 15:Assumption of Mary
August 30-September 2-2012 Asian Tour, partially held in Switzerland

September
September 8: 2012 Asian Tour, partially held in Switzerland, ends
September 16: Swiss federal fast
September 30: L'effet caribou, humorous television series is released

October
October 4-October 7-2012 Swiss Cup Basel is in play
October 22-October 28-2012 Swiss Indoors is in play

November
November 1:All Saints' Day

December
December 8:Feast of the Immaculate Conception
December 24:Christmas Eve
December 25:Christmas Day
December 26:St. Stephen's Day
December 26-December 31-2012 Spengler Cup was in play
December 31:New Year's Eve

Awards

Establishments
Swiss Space Systems
1. Liga Promotion

Deaths

 12 March – Friedhelm Konietzka, 73, German-born Swiss footballer and manager (born 1938)
 7 July - Leon Schlumpf.
 13 September - Otto Stich.

See also 
 :de:Feiertage in der Schweiz (Public holidays in Switzerland)
 Deaths in 2012
 List of Swiss people
 List of number-one hits of 2012 (Switzerland)
 2012 Swiss referendums
 :Category:2012 in Swiss sport

References

 
2012 in Europe